Eckhard Krotscheck is an American physicist and inventor of Fermi hypernetted-chain theory.

Krotscheck is currently a SUNY Distinguished Professor at the State University of New York and a published author. He is also a Fellow of the American Physical Society. In 2007, he received the Eugene Feenberg Memorial Medal.

References

External links
 

Year of birth missing (living people)
Living people
State University of New York faculty
21st-century American physicists
21st-century German physicists
Fellows of the American Physical Society